Crystal Cup may refer to:
 Crystal Cup (cycling) U.S. Air Force cycle race
 Crystal Cup (steeplechasing) European horserace series

See also
 Waterford Crystal Cup 2006–2015 Munster hurling competition